Saint Genevieve or Sainte-Geneviève may refer to:
 Saint Genevieve (419/422–512), the patron of Paris
 Saint Geneviève de Loqueffret (10th century), a local saint from Loqueffret, Brittany

Buildings 
 Bibliothèque Sainte-Geneviève, a library in the 5th arrondissement of Paris
 Abbey of St Genevieve, a French monastery in Paris, suppressed at the time of the French Revolution
 Panthéon, Paris, originally built as a church dedicated to Saint Geneviève

Places

France 
 Montagne Sainte-Geneviève, a hill on the left Bank of the Seine in Paris
 Sainte-Geneviève, Aisne, in the Aisne department
 Sainte-Geneviève, Manche, in the Manche department
 Sainte-Geneviève, Meurthe-et-Moselle, in the Meurthe-et-Moselle department
 Sainte-Geneviève, Oise, in the Oise department
 Sainte-Geneviève, Seine-Maritime, in the Seine-Maritime department
 Sainte-Geneviève-des-Bois, Loiret, in the Loiret department
 Sainte-Geneviève-des-Bois, Essonne, in the Essonne department
 Sainte-Geneviève-lès-Gasny, in the Eure department
 Sainte-Geneviève-sur-Argence, in the Aveyron department

Canada 
 Sainte-Geneviève, Quebec, a borough of Montreal
 Église Sainte-Geneviève, Montréal
 Ste-Geneviève, a community of the Rural Municipality of Taché, Manitoba
 Sainte-Geneviève-de-Batiscan, Quebec, in Les Chenaux Regional County Municipality
 Sainte-Geneviève-de-Berthier, Quebec, in D'Autray Regional County Municipality

United States 
 Ste. Genevieve, Missouri
 Ste. Genevieve County, Missouri